All Saints' Church, Huthwaite is a parish church in the Church of England in Huthwaite, Nottinghamshire.

History
The church dates from 1903 and the stone was taken from a seam in the local colliery and delivered to the site by the colliers.

Sources

Huthwaite